The Kid is a 1910 American short silent drama film directed by Frank Powell and starring Henry B. Walthall. Mary Pickford and Blanche Sweet are listed as appearing in this film, but their parts are unconfirmed.

Cast
 Henry B. Walthall - Walter Holden
 Jack Pickford - Walter Holden's Son
 Florence Barker - Doris Marshall
 Mary Pickford (unconfirmed)
 Blanche Sweet (unconfirmed)

See also
 Mary Pickford filmography
 Blanche Sweet filmography

References

External links

1910 films
1910 drama films
1910 short films
Silent American drama films
American silent short films
American black-and-white films
Biograph Company films
Films directed by Frank Powell
1910s American films